In mathematics, catastrophe theory is a branch of bifurcation theory in the study of dynamical systems; it is also a particular special case of more general singularity theory in geometry.

Bifurcation theory studies and classifies phenomena characterized by sudden shifts in behavior arising from small changes in circumstances, analysing how the qualitative nature of equation solutions depends on the parameters that appear in the equation.  This may lead to sudden and dramatic changes, for example the unpredictable timing and magnitude of a landslide.

Catastrophe theory originated with the work of the French mathematician René Thom in the 1960s, and became very popular due to the efforts of Christopher Zeeman in the 1970s. It considers the special case where the long-run stable equilibrium can be identified as the minimum of a smooth, well-defined potential function (Lyapunov function).
Small changes in certain parameters of a nonlinear system can cause equilibria to appear or disappear, or to change from attracting to repelling and vice versa, leading to large and sudden changes of the behaviour of the system.  However, examined in a larger parameter space, catastrophe theory reveals that such bifurcation points tend to occur as part of well-defined qualitative geometrical structures.

In the late 1970s, applications of catastrophe theory to areas outside its scope began to be criticized, especially in biology and social sciences. Zahler and Sussmann, in a 1977 article in Nature, referred to such applications as being "characterised by incorrect reasoning, far-fetched assumptions, erroneous consequences, and exaggerated claims". As a result, catastrophe theory has become less popular in applications.

Elementary catastrophes
Catastrophe theory analyzes degenerate critical points of the potential function — points where not just the first derivative, but one or more higher derivatives of the potential function are also zero.  These are called the germs of the catastrophe geometries. The degeneracy of these critical points can be unfolded by expanding the potential function as a Taylor series in small perturbations of the parameters.

When the degenerate points are not merely accidental, but are structurally stable, the degenerate points exist as organising centres for particular geometric structures of lower degeneracy, with critical features in the parameter space around them.  If the potential function depends on two or fewer active variables, and four or fewer active parameters, then there are only seven generic structures for these bifurcation geometries, with corresponding standard forms into which the Taylor series around the catastrophe germs can be transformed by diffeomorphism (a smooth transformation whose inverse is also smooth).  These seven fundamental types are now presented, with the names that Thom gave them.

Potential functions of one active variable
Catastrophe theory studies dynamical systems that describe the evolution of a state variable   over time :

The value of  may change over time, and it can also be referred to as the control variable. In the following examples, parameters like  are such controls.

Fold catastrophe 

When , the potential V has two extrema - one stable, and one unstable.  If the parameter a is slowly increased, the system can follow the stable minimum point.  But at  the stable and unstable extrema meet, and annihilate.  This is the bifurcation point.  At  there is no longer a stable solution.  If a physical system is followed through a fold bifurcation, one therefore finds that as a reaches 0, the stability of the  solution is suddenly lost, and the system will make a sudden transition to a new, very different behaviour.  This bifurcation value of the parameter a is sometimes called the "tipping point".

Cusp catastrophe

The cusp geometry is very common when one explores what happens to a fold bifurcation if a second parameter, b, is added to the control space.  Varying the parameters, one finds that there is now a curve (blue) of points in (a,b) space where stability is lost, where the stable solution will suddenly jump to an alternate outcome.

But in a cusp geometry the bifurcation curve loops back on itself, giving a second branch where this alternate solution itself loses stability, and will make a jump back to the original solution set.  By repeatedly increasing b and then decreasing it, one can therefore observe hysteresis loops, as the system alternately follows one solution, jumps to the other, follows the other back, and then jumps back to the first.

However, this is only possible in the region of parameter space .  As a is increased, the hysteresis loops become smaller and smaller, until above  they disappear altogether (the cusp catastrophe), and there is only one stable solution.

One can also consider what happens if one holds b constant and varies a.  In the symmetrical case , one observes a pitchfork bifurcation as a is reduced, with one stable solution suddenly splitting into two stable solutions and one unstable solution as the physical system passes to  through the cusp point (0,0) (an example of spontaneous symmetry breaking).  Away from the cusp point, there is no sudden change in a physical solution being followed: when passing through the curve of fold bifurcations, all that happens is an alternate second solution becomes available.

A famous suggestion is that the cusp catastrophe can be used to model the behaviour of a stressed dog, which may respond by becoming cowed or becoming angry.  The suggestion is that at moderate stress, the dog will exhibit a smooth transition of response from cowed to angry, depending on how it is provoked.  But higher stress levels correspond to moving to the region.  Then, if the dog starts cowed, it will remain cowed as it is irritated more and more, until it reaches the 'fold' point, when it will suddenly, discontinuously snap through to angry mode.  Once in 'angry' mode, it will remain angry, even if the direct irritation parameter is considerably reduced.

A simple mechanical system, the "Zeeman Catastrophe Machine", nicely illustrates a cusp catastrophe.  In this device, smooth variations in the position of the end of a spring can cause sudden changes in the rotational position of an attached wheel.

Catastrophic failure of a complex system with parallel redundancy can be evaluated based on the relationship between local and external stresses. The model of the structural fracture mechanics is similar to the cusp catastrophe behavior. The model predicts reserve ability of a complex system.

Other applications include the outer sphere electron transfer frequently encountered in chemical and biological systems, modelling the dynamics of cloud condensation nuclei in the atmosphere, and modelling real estate prices.

Fold bifurcations and the cusp geometry are by far the most important practical consequences of catastrophe theory.  They are patterns which reoccur again and again in physics, engineering and mathematical modelling.
They produce the strong gravitational lensing events and provide astronomers with one of the methods used for detecting black holes and the dark matter of the universe, via the phenomenon of gravitational lensing producing multiple images of distant quasars.

The remaining simple catastrophe geometries are very specialised in comparison, and presented here only for curiosity value.

Swallowtail catastrophe

The control parameter space is three-dimensional.  The bifurcation set in parameter space is made up of three surfaces of fold bifurcations, which meet in two lines of cusp bifurcations, which in turn meet at a single swallowtail bifurcation point.

As the parameters go through the surface of fold bifurcations, one minimum and one maximum of the potential function disappear. At the cusp bifurcations, two minima and one maximum are replaced by one minimum; beyond them the fold bifurcations disappear. At the swallowtail point, two minima and two maxima all meet at a single value of x. Salvador Dalí's last painting, The Swallow's Tail, was based on this catastrophe.

Butterfly catastrophe

Depending on the parameter values, the potential function may have three, two, or one different local minima, separated by the loci of fold bifurcations.  At the butterfly point, the different 3-surfaces of fold bifurcations, the 2-surfaces of cusp bifurcations, and the lines of swallowtail bifurcations all meet up and disappear, leaving a single cusp structure remaining when .

Potential functions of two active variables

Umbilic catastrophes are examples of corank 2 catastrophes. They can be observed in optics in the focal surfaces created by light reflecting off a surface in three dimensions and are intimately connected with the geometry of nearly spherical surfaces: umbilical point.
Thom proposed that the hyperbolic umbilic catastrophe modeled the breaking of a wave and the elliptical umbilic modeled the creation of hair-like structures.

Hyperbolic umbilic catastrophe

Elliptic umbilic catastrophe

Parabolic umbilic catastrophe

Arnold's notation
Vladimir Arnold gave the catastrophes the ADE classification, due to a deep connection with simple Lie groups. 
A0 - a non-singular point: .
A1 - a local extremum, either a stable minimum or unstable maximum .
A2 - the fold
A3 - the cusp
A4 - the swallowtail
A5 - the butterfly
Ak - a representative of an infinite sequence of one variable forms 
D4− - the elliptical umbilic
D4+ - the hyperbolic umbilic
D5 - the parabolic umbilic
Dk - a representative of an infinite sequence of further umbilic forms
E6 - the symbolic umbilic 
E7
E8
There are objects in singularity theory which correspond to most of the other simple Lie groups.

See also

 Broken symmetry
 Butterfly effect
 Chaos theory
 Domino effect
 Inflection point
 Morphology
 Phase transition
 Punctuated equilibrium
 Snowball effect
 Spontaneous symmetry breaking

References

Bibliography
Arnold, Vladimir Igorevich. Catastrophe Theory, 3rd ed. Berlin: Springer-Verlag, 1992.
V. S. Afrajmovich, V. I. Arnold, et al., Bifurcation Theory And Catastrophe Theory, 
Bełej,M. Kulesza, S. Modeling the Real Estate Prices in Olsztyn under Instability Conditions. Folia Oeconomica Stetinensia. Volume 11, Issue 1, Pages 61–72, ISSN (Online) 1898-0198, ISSN (Print) 1730-4237, 2013
Castrigiano, Domenico P. L. and Hayes, Sandra A. Catastrophe Theory, 2nd ed. Boulder: Westview, 2004. 
Gilmore, Robert. Catastrophe Theory for Scientists and Engineers. New York: Dover, 1993.
Petters, Arlie O., Levine, Harold and Wambsganss, Joachim. Singularity Theory and Gravitational Lensing. Boston: Birkhäuser, 2001. 
Postle, Denis. Catastrophe Theory – Predict and avoid personal disasters. Fontana Paperbacks, 1980. 
Poston, Tim and Stewart, Ian. Catastrophe: Theory and Its Applications. New York: Dover, 1998. .
Sanns, Werner. Catastrophe Theory with Mathematica: A Geometric Approach. Germany: DAV, 2000.
Saunders, Peter Timothy. An Introduction to Catastrophe Theory. Cambridge, England: Cambridge University Press, 1980.
Thom, René. Structural Stability and Morphogenesis: An Outline of a General Theory of Models. Reading, MA: Addison-Wesley, 1989. .
Thompson, J. Michael T. Instabilities and Catastrophes in Science and Engineering. New York: Wiley, 1982.
Woodcock, Alexander Edward Richard and Davis, Monte. Catastrophe Theory. New York: E. P. Dutton, 1978. .
Zeeman, E.C. Catastrophe Theory-Selected Papers 1972–1977. Reading, MA: Addison-Wesley, 1977.

External links
CompLexicon: Catastrophe Theory
Catastrophe teacher
Java simulation of Zeeman's catastrophe machine

Bifurcation theory
Singularity theory
Systems theory
Chaos theory